Guillano Grot (born 15 March 1983) is a Surinamese footballer who plays as a striker for Sportclub NEC (NEC Amateurs) in the Dutch Eerste Klasse, the sixth tier of Dutch football.

Career 
He was born in Paramaribo, Suriname and raised in Arnhem, Netherlands. He began his career with Vitesse 1992, before moving to NEC in 2000. He played one year for the side from Nijmegen, before choosing to play for amateur club De Treffers in 2001; he played for 4 years. In the 2003–2004 season, he was loaned to regional German club, 1. FC Bocholt.

In 2005, he returned to NEC, where he then played between 2005 and 2007. In 2006, he was loaned to Excelsior. In July 2007 he left NEC, and signed with Helmond Sport. Already in August 2008, he was loaned out to FC Inter Turku. He won the 2008 Championship in the Finnish League. In December 2008, Grot signed a two-year contract with FC Inter, at least staying until December 2010. He was released at Turku at the end of the 2010 season and joined his brother Sherwin at his former club De Treffers.

References

External links
Grot on VI.nl
Guardian Football

1983 births
Living people
Sportspeople from Paramaribo
Dutch footballers
Surinamese emigrants to the Netherlands
Dutch expatriate footballers
Association football midfielders
Eredivisie players
Eerste Divisie players
Derde Divisie players
Veikkausliiga players
Excelsior Rotterdam players
NEC Nijmegen players
Helmond Sport players
1. FC Bocholt players
Expatriate footballers in Finland
FC Inter Turku players
Dutch expatriate sportspeople in Finland
De Treffers players
WKE players
FC Lienden players